"Sous le vent" (meaning under the wind and leeward) is a duet between Garou and Celine Dion, released on 29 October 2001. It is the third single from Garou's 2000 album, Seul. "Sous le vent" was also included on Dion's 2005 greatest hits compilation, On ne change pas. The song was written by Jacques Veneruso, who later penned other songs for Dion, including "Tout l'or des hommes", "Je ne vous oublie pas", and "Parler à mon père".

Background and release
The music video for "Sous le vent" was directed by Istan Rozumny and released on 4 September 2001. It was included on Dion's DVD On ne change pas. A previous video, showing Dion and Garou in the studio, was made in 2000.

Dion performed the song few times live with Garou, including at the 2001 ADISQ gala awards as well as in front of 250,000 spectators at Quebec's 400th anniversary celebration, which was included on her DVD Céline sur les Plaines in 2008. She also sang it as a duet with Marc Dupré in 2002, with whom she recorded "Tout près du bonheur" in 2005.

The song was a smash hit in Francophone countries, reaching number one in France (three weeks at the top), Belgium (one week), and number two in Switzerland. It was certified Diamond in France (750,000 copies), and Platinum in Belgium (50,000) and Switzerland (40,000). "Sous le vent" made the slowest-ever climb to number one in Belgium's Wallonia, taking sixteen weeks to get there. As of August 2014, it is the seventieth best-selling single of the 21st century in France, with 352,000 units sold. In Quebec, "Sous le vent" entered the chart on 20 October 2001, topped it for four three weeks, and spent thirty-two weeks there in total.

"Sous le vent" won the NRJ Music Award in 2002 for the Francophone Duo/Group of the Year and the Victoire de la Musique the same year, for Original Song of the Year. It was also nominated for two Félix Awards: Most Popular Song of the Year and Video of the Year.

The track was also a B-side to the "A New Day Has Come" UK single and "Tout l'or des hommes" European single. A new version, with 500 Choristes, was included on the 2005 single "Je ne vous oublie pas".

Formats and track listings
 European CD single
 "Sous le vent" – 3:30
 "Au plaisir de ton corps" – 4:38
 European CD maxi single
 "Sous le vent" – 3:30
 "Au plaisir de ton corps" – 4:38
 "Sous le vent" (Music Video) – 3:30

Charts

Weekly charts

Year-end charts

Certifications and sales

Release history

See also
 French Top 100 singles of the 2000s
 List of number-one singles of 2001 (France)
 Ultratop 40 number-one hits of 2002

References

External links
 

Celine Dion songs
Garou (singer) songs
2001 singles
French-language songs
Male–female vocal duets
SNEP Top Singles number-one singles
Pop ballads
Songs written by Jacques Veneruso
2000 songs